Problepsis longipannis is a moth of the  family Geometridae. It is found in India (the Khasia Hills).

References

Moths described in 1917
Scopulini
Moths of Asia